The men's tournament in volleyball at the 1968 Summer Olympics was the 2nd edition of the event at the Summer Olympics, organized by the world's governing body, the FIVB in conjunction with the IOC. It was held in Mexico City, Mexico from 13 to 26 October 1968.

Qualification

* Romania and Tunisia withdrew and were replaced by Belgium and Bulgaria respectively.

Rosters

Venues

Round robin

|}

|}

Final standing

Medalists

References

External links
Final Standing (1964–2000)
Results at Todor66.com
Results at Sports123.com

O
1968
Men's events at the 1968 Summer Olympics